Viking Press (formally Viking Penguin, also listed as Viking Books) is an American publishing company owned by Penguin Random House. It was founded in New York City on March 1, 1925, by Harold K. Guinzburg and George S. Oppenheim and then acquired by the Penguin Group in 1975.

History
Guinzburg, a Harvard graduate and former employee of Simon and Schuster and Oppenheimer, a graduate of Williams College and Alfred A. Knopf, founded Viking in 1925 with the goal of publishing nonfiction and "distinguished fiction with some claim to permanent importance rather than ephemeral popular interest." B. W. Huebsch joined the firm shortly afterward. Harold Guinzburg's son Thomas became president in 1961.

The firm's name and logo—a Viking ship drawn by Rockwell Kent—were meant to evoke the ideas of adventure, exploration, and enterprise implied by the word "Viking."

In August 1961, they acquired H.B. Huesbsch, which maintained a list of backlist titles from authors such as James Joyce and Sherwood Anderson.  The first imprint was The Book of American Negro Spirituals, edited by James Weldon Johnson.  The young firm focused on aggressive advertising and a liberal return policy.  These policies, along with popular fiction authors Dorothy Parker, D. H. Lawrence and Erskine Caldwell, as well as non-fiction authors Bertrand Russell and Mohandis Gandhi, helped the firm weather the Depression.     

The house has been home to many prominent authors of fiction, non-fiction, and play scripts. Five Viking authors have been awarded Nobel Prizes for Literature and one received the Nobel Peace Prize; Viking books have also won numerous Pulitzer Prizes, National Book Awards, and other important literary prizes.

In 1943, the Viking Portable Library was introduced, a series designed to provide compact, well-printed anthologies for the general reader and college students.  These compilations encompassed works by Hemingway, Steinbeck and Shakespeare.  Over the next decade, Viking published works by Lillian Hellman, Arthur Miller, Rumer Godden and Rex Stout.  Saul Bellow published his third novel, The Adventure of Augie March in 1953, and would publish his next five works with the press, including the Pulitzer Prize winning Humboldt's Gift in 1975.  In 1957, Jack Kerouac's On the Road was published by the press, and during the 1960s Viking published works by Hannah Arendt, Theodore Draper, Zbignew Brzezinski, Ian Fleming, Ken Kesey, and Jimmy Breslin.

Viking publishes approximately 75 books a year. It has published both successful commercial fiction and acclaimed literary fiction and non-fiction, and its paperbacks are most often published by Penguin Books. Viking's current president is Brian Tart.

Imprints
 Viking Kestrel
 Viking Adult, who got in legal trouble in 1946 due to John Steinbeck’s bold eulogy, and fell out of public favor in 1947
 Viking children's Books
 Viking Portable Library
 Pamela Dorman Books

Viking Children's

In 1933, Viking Press founded a department called Junior Books to publish children's books. The first book published was The Story About Ping in 1933 under editor May Massee. Junior Books was later renamed Viking Children's Books. Viking Kestrel was one of its imprints. 

Its books have won the Newbery and Caldecott Medals, and include such books as The Twenty-One Balloons, written and illustrated by William Pene du Bois (1947, Newbery medal winner for 1948), Corduroy, Make Way for Ducklings, The Stinky Cheese Man by Jon Scieszka and Lane Smith (1993), The Outsiders, Pippi Longstocking, and The Story of Ferdinand. Its paperbacks are now published by Puffin Books, which includes the Speak and Firebird imprints.

Viking Critical Library

The Viking Critical Library offers academic editions of literary texts. Like W. W. Norton's Norton Critical Editions, all titles print the text alongside a selection of critical essays and contextual documents (including relevant extracts from the author's oeuvre). The series, which only saw sporadic publications in the late '70s and late '90s, has been dormant since 1998, with no new titles released since then. However, a number of existing titles remain in print.

Titles

Notable authors

 Abdullah II, King of Jordan
 Kingsley Amis
 Sherwood Anderson
 Hannah Arendt
 Antony Beevor
 Saul Bellow
 Ludwig Bemelmans
 Dan Blum
 T. C. Boyle
 Geraldine Brooks
 Daniel James Brown
 William S. Burroughs
 Lan Cao
 Rosanne Cash
 Ferreira de Castro
 J. M. Coetzee
 Leonard Cohen
 Roald Dahl
 Theodore Draper
 Lawrence Durrell
 Kim Edwards
 Daniel Ellsberg
 Helen Fielding
 Frederick Forsyth
 Don Freeman
 Tana French
 Elizabeth George
 Elizabeth Gilbert
 Rumer Godden
 Will Gompertz
 Graham Greene
 R. K. Narayan
 Robert Greene
 Martha Grimes
 S. E. Hinton
 David Irving
 Kristopher Jansma
 James Weldon Johnson
 James Joyce
 Jan Karon
 Ezra Jack Keats
 Garrison Keillor
 William Kennedy
 Jack Kerouac
 Ken Kesey
 Sue Monk Kidd
 Stephen King
 Jamil Jan Kochai
 D. H. Lawrence
 Tobsha Learner
 Rebecca Makkai
 Hilary Mantel
 Peter Matthiessen
 Robert McCloskey
 Terry McMillan
 Arthur Miller
 Jojo Moyes
 John Julius Norwich
 Barack Obama
 Michelle Obama
 Octavio Paz
 Steven Pinker
 Thomas Pynchon
 Ruth Sawyer
 Jon Scieszka
 Kate Seredy
 Katherine Binney Shippen
 Upton Sinclair
 Wallace Stegner
 John Steinbeck
 Rex Stout
 August Strindberg
 Simms Taback
 Whitney Terrell
 Barbara Tuchman
 Carl Van Doren
 William T. Vollmann
 David Foster Wallace
 Rosemary Wells
 Rebecca West
 Patrick White
Vikram Sampath

Notable editors
 Jacqueline Kennedy Onassis, consulting editor
 Wendy Wolf, vice president and associate editor, 1994-

Awards 
 10 Newbery Medals
 10 Caldecott Medals
 27 Newbery Honors
 33 Caldecott Honors
 1 American Book Award
 2 Coretta Scott King Awards
 3 Batcheldor Honors
 5 Christopher Medals
 2 Margaret A. Edwards Awards for authors S. E. Hinton and Richard Peck

References

Further reading
Bean, Martha Sue. A History and Profile of the Viking Press, Chapel Hill, NC: University of North Carolina Theses, 1969.

"Viking Press, Viking Penguin", Dictionary of Literary Biography, Volume 46, pp. 365-368.

External links 
 Viking Press overview at Penguin
 Viking Press history at Penguin (page from August 28, 2006 stored by the Internet Archive)
 Viking Children's Books overview at Penguin
 Viking Children's Books history at Penguin (page from April 26, 2008 stored by the Internet Archive)

 
Book publishing companies based in New York (state)
Publishing companies based in New York City
Publishing companies established in 1925
1925 establishments in New York City
1975 mergers and acquisitions
Random House